Yujiulü Tuhezhen (pinyin: Yùjiǔlǘ Tǔhèzhēn) was ruler of the Rouran from September 444 to 464 with the title of Chu Khagan (處可汗). He was the son of Yujiulü Wuti.

Reign 
He inherited a war with Northern Wei from his father but 5 years of his reign went relatively calm. In winter 448 and spring 449, Emperor Taiwu and Crown Prince Huang attacked Rouran together, but Tuhezhen eluded them and did not engage them. In fall 449, however, Tuoba Na, Wei general was able to inflict heavy losses on Rouran, and for several years Rouran did not attack.

In winter 458, Emperor Wencheng launched a major attack against Rouran, but considered abandoning it when his troops encountered a snow storm. At Yuchi Juan's urging (arguing that a withdrawal would unduly signal weakness to Rouran), however, Emperor Wencheng continued, and while he was not able to deal a major defeat to Tuhezhen, a number of Rouran tribesmen surrendered.

During his reign, last remnant of Northern Liang was invaded and Juqu Anzhou deposed in 460. Tuhezhen made Kan Bozhou (闞伯周) the King of Gaochang instead.

He was succeeded by Yujiulü Yucheng in 464.

Sources 

History of the Northern Dynasties, vol. 86.
Book of Wei, vol 103.

References 

 

Khagans of the Rouran